NA-170 Rahim Yar Khan-II is a constituency for the National Assembly of Pakistan.

Election 2002 

General elections were held on 10 Oct 2002. Major(R) Syed Tanveer Hussain Syed of PPP won by 45,500 votes.

Election 2008 

General elections were held on 18 Feb 2008. Mian Abdul Sattar of PPP won by 58,572 votes.

Election 2013 

General elections were held on 11 May 2013. Sheikh Fayyaz Ud Din of PML-N won by 86,232 votes and became the  member of National Assembly.

Election 2018 

General elections are scheduled to be held on 25 July 2018.

See also
NA-169 Rahim Yar Khan-I
NA-171 Rahim Yar Khan-III

References

External links 
Election result's official website

NA-193